The U.S. state of Pennsylvania elected its United States representatives at-large on a general ticket for the first and third United States Congresses. General ticket representation was prohibited by the 1842 Apportionment Bill and subsequent legislation, most recently in 1967.

Some representatives, including Galusha A. Grow, served at-large after 1842 (in Grow's case, it was from 1894 to 1903). This was allowed because Pennsylvania had received an increase in the number of its representatives yet its legislature didn't pass an apportionment bill during those years.

List of representatives

1789–1795: Eight then thirteen seats 
Representatives were elected statewide at-large on a general ticket.

After 1795, most representatives were elected in districts. Occasionally, at-large representatives were also elected.

1873–1945 

No at-large representatives were apportioned after the 78th Congress.

References

 Congressional Biographical Directory of the United States 1774–present

At-large
Former congressional districts of the United States
At-large United States congressional districts
Constituencies established in 1789
1789 establishments in Pennsylvania
Constituencies disestablished in 1791
1791 disestablishments in Pennsylvania
Constituencies established in 1793
1793 establishments in Pennsylvania
Constituencies disestablished in 1795
1795 disestablishments in Pennsylvania
Constituencies established in 1873
1873 establishments in Pennsylvania
Constituencies disestablished in 1875
1875 disestablishments in Pennsylvania
Constituencies established in 1883
1883 establishments in Pennsylvania
Constituencies disestablished in 1889
1889 disestablishments in Pennsylvania
Constituencies established in 1893
1893 establishments in Pennsylvania
Constituencies disestablished in 1903
1903 disestablishments in Pennsylvania
Constituencies established in 1913
1913 establishments in Pennsylvania
Constituencies disestablished in 1923
1923 disestablishments in Pennsylvania
Constituencies established in 1943
1943 establishments in Pennsylvania
Constituencies disestablished in 1945
1945 disestablishments in Pennsylvania